City of Dreams may refer to:

Casinos
City of Dreams (casino), in Cotai, Macau, China
City of Dreams Manila, in Entertainment City, Metro Manila, Philippines

Literature
City of Dreams (book), a 2015 short-story collection by Pranaya SJB Rana
City of Dreams (novel), a 2001 historical novel by Beverly Swerling
City of Dreams, a 2010 historical novel by William Martin

Music
 City of Dreams, an album by Chico Pinheiro, 2020
"City of Dreams" (Dirty South and Alesso song), 2013
"City of Dreams" (Joel Turner song), 2007
"City of Dreams", a song by Talking Heads from True Stories, 2015

Television
City of Dreams (TV series), a 2019 Indian drama series

Cities with the nickname

Mumbai, India
Vienna, Austria